Montey Stevenson (born April 8, 1985) is a former professional Canadian and Arena football defensive tackle. He was signed by the New Orleans VooDoo as an undrafted free agent in 2008. He played college football at North Texas.

Stevenson was also a member of the Calgary Stampeders.

Professional career

NFL
After going undrafted in the 2008 NFL Draft, Stevenson attended a tryout camp for the Minnesota Vikings and a mini-camp with the New Orleans Saints.

New Orleans VooDoo
Stevenson signed with the New Orleans VooDoo shortly after attending mini-camp with the Saints.

Calgary Stampeders
On February 19, 2009, Stevenson was signed by the Calgary Stampeders.

External links
Calgary Stampeders bio

1985 births
Living people
People from Cleburne, Texas
American players of Canadian football
American football defensive tackles
Canadian football defensive linemen
North Texas Mean Green football players
New Orleans VooDoo players
Calgary Stampeders players